Mayabina is a genus of small, left-handed or sinistral, air-breathing freshwater snails, aquatic pulmonate gastropod mollusks in the subfamily Aplexinae of the family Physidae.

Species
 Mayabina bullula (Crosse & P. Fischer, 1882)
 Mayabina carolita (Jousseaume, 1887)
 Mayabina nitidula (Clessin, 1886)
 Mayabina obtusa (Clessin, 1885)
 Mayabina petenensis D. W. Taylor, 2003
 Mayabina pliculosa (E. von Martens, 1898)
 Mayabina polita D. W. Taylor, 2003
 Mayabina sanctijohannis D. W. Taylor, 2003
 Mayabina spiculata (Morelet, 1849)
 Mayabina tapanensis (Crosse & P. Fischer, 1882)
 Mayabina tempisquensis D. W. Taylor, 2003

References

 Bank, R. A. (2017). Classification of the Recent freshwater/brackish Gastropoda of the World. Last update: January 24th, 2018

External links

 Taylor, D. W. (2003). Introduction to Physidae (Gastropoda: Hygrophila); biogeography, classification, morphology. Revista de Biología Tropical. 51(Suppl. 1): 1-263 (includes a Catalog of species, pp. 197-263)

Physidae